Mesorhizobium amorphae is a species of root nodule bacteria first isolated from Amorpha fruticosa species in China. It is purported to be native to American soil. Its genome has been sequenced. Its type strain is ACCC 19665.

References

Further reading

External links

LPSN
Type strain of Mesorhizobium amorphae at BacDive -  the Bacterial Diversity Metadatabase

Phyllobacteriaceae
Bacteria described in 1999